Heinrich Moser may refer to:
 Heinrich Moser (watchmaker)
 Heinrich Moser (artist)